Een dagje naar het strand  (is a 1984 Dutch film directed by Theo van Gogh, based on a 1962 book by Dutch author Heere Heeresma. The soundtrack was made by Willem van Eekeren. The 1970 film A Day at the Beach is also based on the book by Heeresma, in cooperation with Roman Polanski.

Plot
The plot is about Bernard and his daughter Walijne. Bernard takes her for a day at the beach in Scheveningen, but his drinking problem eventually turns out to be the factor that doesn't make the day as fun as it was supposed to be.

Cast
Cas Enklaar as Bernard
Tara Fallaux as Walijne
Helen Hedy as Medusa
Emile Fallaux as Carl
Jojet Mulder as the Lady in the elevator
Henk Laan as Louis
Bill Wiggers as Lelieveld
Hans Franzen as Fisherman
Iet van Ringen as Lady
Heere Heeresma Narrator (voice)

External links 
 

Dutch comedy-drama films
1984 films
1980s Dutch-language films
Films directed by Theo van Gogh
Films based on Dutch novels
Films about alcoholism